Churni may refer to:
River Churni, a river in the Nadia district, West Bengal
Churni Ganguly, a Bengali actress
Churni (song), a Bengali song by Silajit Majumder